Choe Sang-rim() (17 November 1888 – 6 May 1945) was a Korean independence movement activist, Presbyterian priest, and educator during the Korea's independence movement.

Life
Born in Gijang-gun, Dongrae on 17 November 1888, Choe graduated from Pyongyang Missionary School in 1926, and became a priest for Dongraeeup Church.

In 1933, he moved to Namhaeeup Church, and in 1937 became a President of Gyeongsangnam-do Presbyterian Conference.

Starting from October 1938, Choe refused to participate in worship of the Japanese Emperor, which was required by law in the 1930s (see Christianity in Korea: Korean nationalism). He then initiated the movement of antagonism towards Japanese Shinto Shrine worship by focusing on Namhae area.

As the movement of antagonism towards Japanese Shinto Shrine worship was prohibited by the Japanese colonial power during that time, Choe was eventually arrested and remanded in Pyongyang prison along with other anti-Japanese Shrine worship activists.

While still imprisoned, Choe succumbed on 6 May 1945 to the lasting effects he had endured while being tortured. In 1991, the government of South Korea conferred the Order of Merit for National Foundation on Choe Sang-rim.

See also
 Christianity in South Korea

References
 Ministry of Patriots' and Veterans' Affairs (South Korea)|https://web.archive.org/web/20130504203822/http://english.mpva.go.kr/
 The History of Korean Church's persecution
(최훈, 예수교문서선교회), 1979
 The history of Korean religious faith experiences(고택구편, 복음세계사), 1954

1888 births
1945 deaths
Korean priests
Assassinated Korean politicians
20th-century executions by Japan
Executed Korean people
Korean Christians
Recipients of the Order of Merit for National Foundation
People executed by torture
People from Busan
Korean torture victims